The 1942–43 season saw Rochdale compete for their 4th season in the wartime league (League North). The season was split into 2 championships. In the 1st Championship, Rochdale finished in 41st position out of 48, and in the 2nd Championship, they finished 21st out of 28. Some matches in the 2nd Championship were also in the League War Cup and Lancashire Cup.

Statistics
												

|}

Competitions

Football League North & War League Cup

References

Rochdale A.F.C. seasons
Rochdale